Xyleborus sporodochifer is a species of lichen in the family Stereocaulaceae, and the type species of the genus Xyleborus. It was first reported in 2007, and found in the Ozarks of Missouri.

References

Stereocaulaceae
Lichen species
Lichens of the North-Central United States
Lichens described in 2007
Fungi without expected TNC conservation status